Watermill Cove is on the north–east coast of St Mary's, Isles of Scilly.

It is a historic anchorage, still used today by passing yachts and other small vessels. At Tregear's Porth, there are the remains of an old quay, with the slipway still in use for small craft.

The cove is within an Area of Outstanding Beauty, is a Geological Conservation Review site and was designated a Site of Special Scientific Interest (SSSI) in 1996.
The  site is notified for a succession of Quaternary exposures in the cliff and from sea level to the top of the cliff (oldest to youngest) the succession shows:
head deposits
organic silts and sands
head deposits of the Late Devensian with microscopic remains of plants and pollen and dated to c. 30,000 years before present. The remains indicate an Arctic tundra climate
raised beach deposits, a storm beach of the Late Ipswichian interglacial 130,000 years ago and ended about 114,000 years ago.

References

External links
 Isles of Scilly Wildlife Trust

Sites of Special Scientific Interest notified in 1996
Sites of Special Scientific Interest in the Isles of Scilly
St Mary's, Isles of Scilly